The Hüfi Glacier is a  long glacier (2005) situated in the Glarus Alps in the canton of Uri in Switzerland.

See also
List of glaciers in Switzerland
List of glaciers
Retreat of glaciers since 1850
Swiss Alps

External links
Swiss glacier monitoring network

Glaciers of the canton of Uri
Glaciers of the Alps